Paul A. Pacheco is an American politician and a Republican member of the New Mexico House of Representatives representing District 23 since January 15, 2013.

Education
Pacheco graduated from the police academy in 1984.

Elections
2012 With District 23 incumbent Republican Representative David Doyle running for New Mexico Senate, Pacheco was unopposed in the June 5, 2012 Republican Primary, winning with 1,242 votes and won the November 6, 2012 General election by 78 votes with 6,922 votes (50.3%) against Democratic nominee Marci Blaze.
2010 To challenge District 23 incumbent Democratic Representative Benjamin Rodefer, Pacheco ran in the three-way June 1, 2010 Republican Primary, but lost to David Doyle, who went on to win the November 2, 2010 General election against Representative Rodefer.

References

External links
Official page at the New Mexico Legislature

Paul Pacheco at Ballotpedia
Paul A. Pacheco at the National Institute on Money in State Politics

Place of birth missing (living people)
Year of birth missing (living people)
Living people
American police officers
Hispanic and Latino American state legislators in New Mexico
Republican Party members of the New Mexico House of Representatives
Politicians from Albuquerque, New Mexico
21st-century American politicians